Aşağı Salamabad (also, Ashagy Salamabad) is a village and municipality in the Yevlakh Rayon of Azerbaijan.  It has a population of 923.

References 

Populated places in Yevlakh District